The Faroese National Badminton Championships is a tournament organized to crown the best badminton players in Faroe Islands. They've been held since the season 1966.

Past winners

References

External links
Badminton Europe - Faroe Island
Badmintonsamband Føroya

Badminton in the Faroe Islands
National badminton championships
Recurring sporting events established in 1966
Sports competitions in the Faroe Islands